José Luis Fernández Alonso (born 1959) is a Spanish born Colombian botanist. He has published over 20 papers since 1987.

Biography 

He was born in Encinas de Esgueva in the Province of Valladolid, Spain. He graduated in the field of Biology at the Universidad de Salamanca and worked at the Royal Botanical Garden of Madrid, under Santiago Castroviejo, finishing his graduate thesis "Florula of the north west of the Province of Valladolid" in 1985, and his doctoral thesis "Monograph of the neotropical genus Aragoa – Scrophulariaceae family" in 1993.

He moved to Colombia en 1986 to work as an intern and in 1987-1990 as a Cooperating Botanist at the AECI, in the "Flora Project of the Royal Botanical Expedition of the New Kingdom of Granada", at the Institute of Natural Sciences at the National University of Colombia.
 
From 1991 to 2009, he was a professor and research officer at the Institute of Natural Sciences, Faculty of Science at the National University of Colombia in Bogotá, training new biologists in the field of vegetable taxonomy and Colombian flora.

At the Institute, he was curator of the National Colombian Herbary from 1996 to 2000 where he collaborated with other regional herbaries from other universities around the country, which contain many of his collections of vascular plants.
In 2009 he became lead scientist at the CSIC at the Royal Botanical Garden of Madrid, to work on vegetable biodiversity in tropical areas.

References 

 

20th-century Spanish botanists
20th-century  Colombian botanists
1959 births
Living people
University of Salamanca alumni